Henning Braunisch is an electrical engineer who works for Intel. Braunisch was named a Fellow of the Institute of Electrical and Electronics Engineers (IEEE) in 2016 for his contributions to high-bandwidth microprocessor packaging''.

References

Fellow Members of the IEEE
Living people
Year of birth missing (living people)
Place of birth missing (living people)
American electrical engineers